Gangneung Ice Arena is an indoor ice arena, built for the 2018 Winter Olympics. It is located in the coastal city of Gangneung. It was the venue for two sports: figure skating and short track speed skating.

The seating capacity is 12,000. The Gangneung Ice Arena is designed to house two ice rinks, one for competition and one for training. The building has four floors aboveground and two underground levels. An environmentally-friendly ice cooling system was adopted, and the facility is used for local recreational purposes since the Games.

The cost of construction was US$85 million and the facility was inaugurated on 14 December 2016.

See also
 List of indoor arenas in South Korea

References

Sports venues in Gangneung
Venues of the 2018 Winter Olympics
Olympic figure skating venues
Olympic short track speed skating venues
Indoor arenas in South Korea
Sports venues completed in 2016